The Airbus A330neo ("neo" for "New Engine Option") is a wide-body airliner developed by Airbus from the Airbus A330 (now A330ceo – "Current Engine Option").  A new version with modern engines comparable with those developed for the Boeing 787 was called for by operators of the original A330 series.  It was launched on 14 July 2014 at the Farnborough Airshow, promising 14% better fuel economy per seat.  It is exclusively powered by the Rolls-Royce Trent 7000 which has double the bypass ratio of its predecessor.

The -900 made its maiden flight on 19 October 2017 and received its EASA type certificate on 26 September 2018; it was first delivered to TAP Air Portugal on 26 November 2018 and entered service on 15 December. The -800 made its first flight on 6 November 2018 and received EASA type certification on 13 February 2020; the first two -800s were delivered to Kuwait Airways on 29 October 2020 and entered service on 20 November.

, a total of 288 A330neo family aircraft had been ordered by more than 25 customers, of which 93 aircraft had been delivered.

Development

Studies

At the Boeing 787 launch in 2004, Airbus' initial response was an improved A330. After negative feedback from airlines and lessors, the A350 XWB became a new design in 2006. After the A320neo launch in December 2010 and its commercial success, the largest airline of Malaysia – an all-Airbus operator – AirAsia asked Airbus to re-engine the A330. New engines like the GEnx or Rolls-Royce Trent 1000 developed for the 787 could offer a 12%–15% fuel burn improvement, and sharklets at least 2%.

Airbus sales chief John Leahy's argument was that the lower purchase price of an A330 even without new engines make the economics of buying an A330 competitive at midrange routes with that of the Boeing 787. An A330neo would accelerate the demise of the similarly sized A350-800. Airbus also considered re-engining the A380 but was wary of having two major modification programs simultaneously.

In March 2014, Delta Air Lines expressed an interest in the A330neo to replace its ageing, 20+-year-old Boeing 767-300ER jets. In the 250-300-seat market, CIT Group believed an A330neo enables profitability on shorter ranges where the longer-range A350 and Boeing 787 are not optimised. CIT said that the A350-800 was not as efficient as it would like, and Air Lease Corp. added that the company did not consider it reasonable to take the A350-800 and A330neo as they saw no sustainable coexistence of the two aircraft.

AirAsia X ended flights to London and Paris from Kuala Lumpur in 2012 because their Airbus A340s were not fuel-efficient enough and would try again with A330s. As Airbus gradually increased output of the new A350, prolonging the production run of the A330 could help to maintain profitability. After Emirates cancelled 70 orders for the A350, Airbus said it continued to work on re-engining the smaller A330.

Launch

On 14 July 2014 at the Farnborough Airshow, Airbus launched the A330neo programme, to be powered by the new Rolls-Royce Trent 7000. It would improve the fuel burn per seat by 14%. Airbus hoped to sell 1,000 A330neo aircraft. New winglets, 3.7 metres wider and similar to those of the A350 XWB, still within ICAO category E airport requirements, along with new engine pylons, would improve aerodynamics by 4%.

The A330neo's development costs were expected to have an impact of around −0.7% on Airbus's return on sales target from 2015 to 2017, an estimated $2 billion (£1.18 billion). Airbus stated that lower capital cost would make the A330neo the most cost-efficient medium-range wide-body airliner. Airbus said that it could pursue demand for 4,000 aircraft and that there was an open market for 2,600 jets not already addressed by backlogs with operators already using A330s. Aerodynamic modifications would include a re-twisted wing and optimised slats.

In 2014, The Airline Monitors Ed Greenslet stated that the A330neo would have the advantage of not being designed to fly 8,000 nmi, unlike the A350 and Boeing 787 which were thus less economical on shorter routes, although "the vast majority of long-haul markets is 4,000 nmi or less". 
He also believed that an "A330neo would enjoy a monopoly in its segment instantly", with the Boeing 767 "essentially out of production", the Boeing 757 not replaced while the A321neo and the 737-9 are smaller and had less range,  and that launching the A330neo would probably kill the smallest A350-800.

John Leahy estimated that the A330-900 would have operating costs on par with the 787-9, but would be available at 25% lower capital costs and could reach a production rate of 10 per month after a 7/8 per month rate at the production start. Both A330neo variants were expected to have a maximum take-off weight of 242 t. The type design was frozen in late 2015.

Boeing Vice Chairman and Commercial Airplanes CEO Ray Conner dismissed the A330neo as a 2004 revamp which cannot match the 787's direct operating costs, being  heavier and having a wing only slightly improved from the 1980s design, and claimed the 787-10 was almost 30% more efficient per-seat than the previous A330-300 and that a new engine would not close the gap – but he acknowledged that it could be a threat as it put pressure on Boeing as it sought to break even after 850–1,000 787 deliveries.

 Production 

On 7 September 2015, Airbus announced that it had begun production of the first A330neo with the construction of its centre wingbox and engine pylon. Final assembly of the first aircraft, an A330-900, started in September 2016 at the Airbus Toulouse site with the joining of the wings to the centre fuselage at the station 40. In December 2016, the programme schedule slipped by six weeks due to marginal engine development at Rolls-Royce, and launch customer TAP Air Portugal projected its first A330neo would be delivered in March 2018.

The first aircraft left the paint shop in December 2016, awaiting its engines. By April 2017, the Trent 7000s were to be installed later during the summer, so that the first flight was delayed until September.
Due to the delay, TAP Air Portugal was not expected to receive the first A330neo until the end of the first half of 2018, or even in the third quarter.
The engines were shipped to Airbus in June. The aircraft complete with engines showed at Toulouse in September before its first flight.

Major structures of the first A330-800 were entering production in October 2017: high-lift devices are installed on the wing in Bremen, fuselage sections are built in Hamburg, the centre wing-box in Nantes, titanium engine pylons in Toulouse and sharklet wingtips in Korea. Its final assembly started in November 2017, on track for its planned first flight in mid-2018.
Structural assembly was completed by February 2018, having its flight-test instruments installed and waiting for its engines before its 300h flight-test programme.
At this time, production aircraft progressed through the final assembly line with the first 'Airspace' cabin interior being fitted.

A330 production was cut to 50 deliveries in 2019, with more than half of them re-engined A330neos.
In April 2020, the production rate decreased from 3.5 to 2 per month due to the impact of the COVID-19 pandemic on aviation, and finished planes were stored while waiting for deferred deliveries.
In 2018, unit cost was US$259.9 M for a -800 and US$296.4 M for a -900.

 Flight testing 

The A330-900 first flight on 19 October 2017 was a debut of the 1,400 hours flight test campaign involving three prototypes plus the first production aircraft: 1,100 flight hours for the A330-900 and 300 flight hours for the A330-800, targeting mid-2018 EASA and FAA Type Certification. It should establish certain maximum operating points and achieve an initial handling qualities assessment including at high angle of attack. This first aircraft, MSN1795, was scheduled to perform 600 h and was to be joined the following month by the second, MSN1813, which will fly 500 h, before the third, MSN1819, the first customer aircraft for TAP Portugal with a complete cabin.

Two flight test engineers and two engine specialists monitored the 60GB per hour output of 1,375 sensors and 98,000 parameters, including strips of microelectromechanical systems to measure aerodynamic pressure distribution across the wing. MSN1795 was to undertake simulated icing tests and cold-weather tests in Canada, noise assessment, autoland testing and high angle-of-attack, minimum-unstick checks during rotation with a tail bumper. MSN1813 was to test natural icing conditions, assess hot and high conditions in the United Arab Emirates and La Paz, and fly 150h of route-proving; it has rakes and pressure sensors in the engine flows to compare actual thrust with ground bench measurements. MSN1819 was to validate the Airspace cabin interior fitting with artificial passengers for ventilation analysis and cabin environment measurements.

The second test aircraft made its maiden flight on 4 December, to be used to validate aerodynamic & engine performance and airline operations.
By the end of January 2018, the first logged almost 200h in 58 flights while the second had accumulated nearly 120h in 30 flights.
Its flight envelope was fully opened including flutter and stall tests to complete powerplant calibration and strake configuration has been frozen.
Airbus commenced autopilot, autoland and high-speed performance testing, and was to move on to hot- and cold-weather tests, as well as noise and icing tests, over the following three months. 
As of 10 April 2018, the two test aircraft had logged over 200 flights and more than 700 hours, testing −27 °C cold weather, natural icing, crosswind landing, 37 °C and  hot and high operations.

The first TAP Air Portugal aircraft made its first flight on 15 May 2018; it joined the two previous test aircraft to check the cabin systems: air conditioning, crew rest, etc.
It started the final certification step on 18 June: function and reliability tests or route proving, including ETOPS, diversion airport landing, and testing ground handling over 150 flight test hours, as the flight test programme reached 1,000 hours.
Entry into service was planned for the third quarter of 2018 and ETOPS was to be approved in October for 330min.

EASA granted the A330-941 type certificate on 26 September 2018, with ETOPS not yet approved. ETOPS 180 min was approved on 14 November, restricted to engines with fewer than 500 flight cycles. 
Airbus expects the FAA type certification with 180 min ETOPS by the end of 2018 and 330 min ETOPS in the first half of 2019.
Beyond-180min ETOPS was approved by the EASA by 24 January 2019.

The maiden flight of the -800 took place on 6 November 2018; the 4h 4min flight inaugurated a 350h test program aiming for mid-2019 type certification, for delivery in the first half of 2020 to launch operator Kuwait Airways.
By late March 2019, it was halfway through the 300 hours flight-test programme, having completed 44 flights in 149 hours. The -800 received EASA type certification with 180-minute ETOPS on 13 February 2020; ETOPS clearance beyond 180 minutes was awarded on 2 April.

Entry into service
Leased from Avolon, the first A330-900 was delivered to TAP Air Portugal on 26 November 2018, featuring 298 seats: 34 full-flat business, 96 economy plus and 168 economy seats, and to be deployed from Portugal to the Americas and Africa.
TAP made its first commercial flight on 15 December from Lisbon to São Paulo. The airline should receive 15 more A330neos in 2019 and fly the A330-900 from Lisbon to Chicago O'Hare and Washington Dulles from June 2019, both five times a week.

Increased takeoff weight

On the occasion of the 19 October 2017 first flight, an increase to  MTOW by mid-2020 was announced, with a few changes to the landing gear and brakes, increasing its range by  compared to the current A330neo or A330ceo.
The 251 t MTOW was confirmed by Airbus in November 2017.
Test flights of the 251 t A330-900 started from 28 February 2020.

Airbus was expecting a short 30–40h test campaign, as multiple tests were conducted with the previous variant adapted to higher weight, including flight performance and noise assessment.
The heavier structure allows a transpacific range, and is balanced by a weight-reduction effort, keeping the same empty weight and payload.
On 8 October 2020, the 251 t A330-900 was EASA-certified, before introduction by Corsair International.
Retaining 99% spares commonality, it offers  more payload while strengthening the landing-gear and extending the time before overhaul interval from 10 to 12 years.
On 31 March 2021, Corsair took delivery of the first 251t Airbus A330-900 in a three-class, 352-seat configuration.
The 251 t A330-800 was certified by EASA in April 2022.

Design

The larger 112-inch Trent 7000 is 11% more efficient than the 97.5-inch Trent 700 engine, with a 2% loss due to increased weight and 1% due to additional drag from the larger engine, but the sharklets and aero optimization regains 4% for a 12% fuel advantage per trip. Furthermore, fuel consumption per seat is improved by 2% due to the rearranged cabin (Space-Flex and Smart-Lav) with increased seating, offering a 14% fuel burn reduction per seat for the new −900 compared to the previous 235-tonne −300 version. The newer 242-tonne −300 is already 2% more efficient.

Airbus unveiled a distinctive cockpit windscreen to be featured on the A330neo, similar to that on the A350, and promised a new interior concept offering a better passenger experience on the A330neo. Initially based on the largest 242t MTOW A330, Airbus is studying an improvement to  MTOW for the A330neo, which would match the figure originally given for the Airbus A350-800 before it was sidelined in favor of the A330neo. This would give the -900 a  range to better compete with the 787-9’s 

The wing twist and belly fairings are tweaked to approach the lowest drag elliptical span-wise pressure distribution changed by the larger sharklets, like the flap track fairings shape to lower form drag.

 Engines 

Candidate engines included variants of Rolls-Royce's Trent 1000 and General Electric's GEnx-1B. Both engine makers were reportedly interested in winning an exclusive deal should a re-engined A330 be offered. The Trent 1000 TEN (Thrust, Efficiency, New Technology) engine is under development for the 787-10, but Rolls-Royce intends to offer a broad power range.

The A330neo uses the Rolls-Royce Trent 7000 engine, which is an electronic controlled bleed air variant of the Trent 1000 used on the Boeing 787-10. It will have a  diameter fan and a 10:1 bypass ratio.

The Trent is the exclusive powerplant, as Rolls-Royce offered better terms to obtain exclusivity. Customers bemoan the loss of competition among engine makers: Steven Udvar-Hazy, CEO of Air Lease Corporation, said that he wants a choice of engines, but Airbus has pointed out that equipping a commercial aircraft to handle more than one type of engine adds several hundred million dollars to the development cost. The head of Pratt and Whitney said: "Engines are no longer commodities...the optimization of the engine and the aircraft becomes more relevant."

The decision to offer the aircraft with only one engine option is not unique to Airbus; the Boeing 777X will come equipped exclusively with General Electric GE9X engines, after Rolls-Royce made a bid with its Advance configuration but was not selected.

Variants

A330-900
The A330-900 retains the fuselage length of the A330-300 and the similarly sized four-engined A340-300. Cabin optimisation allows ten additional seats on the A330-900 (310 passengers) with 18-inch-wide economy seats. The -900 should travel 6550 nmi (12,130 km) with 287 passengers (440 max).

Delta expects a 20 percent reduction in operating cost per seat over the Boeing 767-300ER aircraft it replaces.

Further reconfiguration of cabin facilities enables the –900 to seat up to 460 passengers in an all-economy layout. This exceeds the existing 440-seat maximum exit limit allowed by the type certificate, and requires a modification of the Type-A exit doors to meet emergency exit requirements.
In November 2019, maximum accommodation increased to 460 seats, through the installation of new 'Type-A+' exits, with a dual-lane evacuation slide.

A330-800

The A330-800 retains the fuselage length of the A330-200, but can seat six more passengers (for a total of 252) with an optimised cabin featuring 18-inch-wide economy seats. The -800 should have a range of 7500 nmi (13,900 km) with 257 passengers (406 max).
As the variants share 99% commonality, developing the smaller -800 has a negligible extra cost.

After the first flight of the -900 on 19 October 2017, Hawaiian Airlines (then the only customer for the -800) considered changing its order for six -800s, 
seeking to best fit its current network to Asia and North America whilst allowing for future growth, possibly to Europe.
Demand for the -800 fell to 3%, whereas the -200 commanded 40% of the ceo deliveries: its range advantage has eroded with the increased capabilities of the -900, and although it offers lower fuel per trip, fuel per seat is higher.

Demand for the -800 is limited by low fuel prices and the fact that the -200s it might replace after 2020 are still young (nine years on average). The Boeing 767-300/400s that the -800 might replace are 15 years older, and while Boeing considered relaunching production of the 767-300ER, mainly as an interim for American and United airlines, this was complicated by a 30-year-old design including obsolete cabin amenities.

Production of the -800 beyond the prototype was in doubt, as Hawaiian was choosing between the Airbus A350-900 and the Boeing 787-8/9.
In February 2018, Hawaiian was thought to be cancelling its order for six A330-800s, replacing them with Boeing 787-9s priced at less than $100–115m, close to their production cost of $80–90m, while Boeing Capital released Hawaiian from three 767-300ER leases well in advance.	
Hawaiian denied that the order for the A330-800 had been cancelled, but did not dismiss a new deal with Boeing.
In March 2018, Hawaiian confirmed the cancellation of its order for six A330-800s and ordered ten B787-9s instead.
Airbus says it was "simply undercut in price".

In July 2018 a new memorandum of understanding from Uganda Airlines for two -800s revived interest in the shorter variant. A firm order from Kuwait Airways for eight A330-800s followed in October 2018, making it the largest customer of the type; it was subsequently confirmed that Kuwait Airways would be the launch customer for the -800, with certification expected in mid-2019 and first deliveries in the first half of 2020.
On 8 April 2019, Uganda National Airlines Company firmed up its order for two -800s.

The A330-800 received EASA type certification on 13 February 2020.
The first aircraft, configured with 226 seats including 23 in business class, was to be delivered to Kuwait Airways in March, but the airline postponed delivery until the third quarter of 2020 amid the COVID-19 pandemic. On 29 October, the first two A330-800s were delivered to Kuwait Airways; the airline has six more -800s on order. The A330-800 then operated its first revenue flight on 20 November, flying the short distance between Kuwait and Dubai. Uganda Airlines received their first A330-800 on 21 December, with the second unit expected in January 2021.

 Freighter 
Amazon Air and UPS Airlines pushed for a freighter version, stretching the A330-900 to carry more cargo over a shorter range, but retired 767s and A330s provide a lot of conversion potential.
Development cost would be lower than for a new program as much of the engineering has already been done for the A330-200F, and more volume would be more appealing to express carriers.

Market

Third party analysis for a 3,350 nmi transatlantic flight shows that the 787-9 has a slight advantage over the A330-900 in cash cost per available seat miles, while the Airbus outperforms the Boeing once capital costs are included, based on the A330-900 cost an estimated $10.6m less.
They have close economics but the A330neo costs up to $30m less, according to another publication.
An A330-900 is worth $115 million in 2018, while a new B787-9 valuation is $145 million, up from $135 million in 2014, but it may have been sold for $110–15 million to prevent A330neo sales.

Between the 2004 launch of the Dreamliner and the A330neo launch in 2014, the market was split almost equally between both, with between 900 and 920 A330ceos sold against 950 to 1,000 787-8/9s.
Between 2014 and the neo first flight in October 2017, the A330/A330neo had  orders (excluding freighters) compared to 272 for the 787-8/9 (excluding the -10), or since the 787 launch,  A330ceo/neos compared to  787-8/9s.
Teal Group's Richard Aboulafia believes that the A330neo should dominate the lower range and lower capacity end of the twin aisle market because the 787-8 has the high operating economics and unit price associated with its 8,000-nm range.

Flightglobal Ascend Consultancy forecast 600 deliveries including 10% of -800 variants, less optimistic than Airbus' 1,000.
At entry into service in 2018, sales were disappointing and A330 production was to be cut to 50 in 2019 down from 67 in 2017: while it was the widebody with the largest operator base with 1,390 deliveries since 1993, the fleet was still very young with only 46 aircraft retired. Airbus believed A330 operators would start fleet renewal beginning in 2020. With the exception of Delta, industry-leading airlines preferred the Boeing 787.

The A330neo program was the best-selling Airbus widebody over the same period.
Airbus believes there is potential for the A330neo in the growing long-haul, low-cost carrier sector. While Airbus expected a market for over 1,000 A330neos, one pessimistic forecast reported in 2018 came in as low as 400 sales, in that the A330neo was late to the market and fuel prices had declined markedly over the years, reducing demand. 19% of A330 operators are already 787 customers though some A330 operators have been dual sourcing from both Boeing and Airbus. Leeham News, on the one hand considered the A330-800 does not really cover the upper end of New Midsize Airplane studied by Boeing for some years, on the other hand stated that the A330-800 provides Airbus a cost-effective entry to the upper end of the middle of the market. In May 2019, Airbus's chief commercial officer made clear the company has a “rock”, the A321neo, and a “hard place”, the A330-800, for any airframer intending to bring a new airplane into the middle of the market at a time when Boeing was mired in the 737 MAX crisis.

Compared to a 283-seat, 9-abreast 787-9, Airbus claims a 1% lower fuel burn for the -900: 3% higher due to the  higher OEW, but 4% lower due to the  wider wingspan, and 3% lower fuel burn per seat in a 287-seat, 8-abreast configuration, reaching 7% with a 303-seat, 9-abreast layout.

Operators

There were 93 aircraft in service with 22 operators .
The five largest operators of A330neo are Delta Air Lines (20), TAP Air Portugal (19), Lion Air (8), Azul Brazilian Airlines (5) and Corsair International (5).

List of operators

Former Operator:
Thai Lion Air

Orders and deliveries
 Orders and deliveries by type and year A330neo family orders and deliveries by year (cumulative)'

 

 Orders and deliveries by customer

 Orders and deliveries graph

Specifications

See also

Notes

References

External links

 
 
 
 
 

Airbus A330
A330neo
2010s international airliners
Aircraft first flown in 2017
Twinjets
Low-wing aircraft
Wide-body aircraft